Olga Polizzi  (born February 1946) is a British hotelier and interior designer. She is a former Westminster City Council councillor, representing Lancaster Gate ward for the Conservative Party.

Family

She is the mother of the broadcaster and The Hotel Inspector presenter Alex Polizzi and Charlotte, who is married to Oliver Peyton. Her brother is Sir Rocco Forte, and their father was Charles Forte, Baron Forte. She is married to William Shawcross (m. 1993), following her former marriage to Count Alessandro Polizzi (m. 1966–1980) until his death.

References

Living people
British people of Italian descent
British hoteliers
Commanders of the Order of the British Empire
Daughters of life peers
Forte family
1946 births
Women hoteliers
Conservative Party (UK) councillors
Councillors in the City of Westminster